Aase Texmon Rygh, (April 13, 1925 – May 21, 2019) was a Norwegian sculptor working in the modernist style.

Early life and education

Aase Texmon Rygh was born in Troms County, Norway. She studied at the Norwegian National Academy of Craft and Art Industry from 1944 until 1946. Two years later, she studied at the Royal Danish Academy of Fine Arts, under Einar Utzon-Frank, for one year. In 1950, she visited Paris, where she visited the Louvre. The visit would be pivotal in shaping her career as a professional artist.

Career

Texmon Rygh primarily exhibited in Norway, with a retrospective exhibition at the Henie-Onstad Art Centre in 1992. She has had solo works and participated in group exhibitions in Oslo, Bergen, Antwerp and Sao Paulo.

Work

The Möbius series were Texmon Rygh's signature works. They are sculptures based on the mathematical Möbius strip as the German mathematician August Ferdinand Möbius developed.

Later life and legacy

In 2001, Aase Texmon Rygh became a knight of 1 Class of the Royal Norwegian Order of St. Olav.

Texmon Rygh died May, 2019.

Notable exhibitions

2018: Aase Texmon Rygh. The Form of Eternity at Alta Museum, Alta, Norway

Notable works
 Spiral II, bronze plaque, 1952 in Tønsberg 
 Bjørn Farmann monument, bronze plaque, 1971 in Tønsberg 
 Løk (Onions), 1977, Norwegian University of Life Sciences, Ås 
 Volta, in 1978, Furuset Senter, Oslo 
 Brutt form (Broken terms), 1983, Furuset Senter, Oslo 
 Möbius triple'', at Ekebergparken Sculpture Park, Oslo

References

External links 

1925 births
2019 deaths
People from Troms
Norwegian sculptors
Norwegian women sculptors
Oslo National Academy of the Arts alumni
Royal Danish Academy of Fine Arts alumni